Andrew Ducros (born 16 September 1977) is an English former footballer who played for Coventry City in the Premier League.

Playing career
Ducros began his career at Coventry City as a trainee in 1994. He Played several games in the first team at Coventry City before being sold on to Nuneaton Borough in 1999. He has since played for Kidderminster Harriers and Burton Albion, after release from his contract in June 2007, he moved on to Solihull Moors.

Evesham United
On 2 February 2010, Ducros signed for Zamaretto League Premier Division side Evesham United from Redditch United.

Andy made his debut for Evesham United the following day in a 2–1 away defeat to Chippenham Town, but limped off on the 34th minute with a calf strain, and was replaced by Leon Woodley.

References

External links

1977 births
Living people
People from Evesham
English footballers
Association football forwards
Coventry City F.C. players
Nuneaton Borough F.C. players
Kidderminster Harriers F.C. players
Burton Albion F.C. players
Solihull Moors F.C. players
Redditch United F.C. players
Evesham United F.C. players
Premier League players
National League (English football) players
Sportspeople from Worcestershire